Petr Vandirek (born 7 April 1962) is a former speedway rider from the Czech Republic.

Speedway career 
Vandirek reached five Individual Speedway Long Track World Championship finals from 1986 until 1990 and won the 1989 Czech Republic Individual Speedway Championship.

He rode in the top tier of British Speedway riding for Exeter Falcons from 1995 until 1996.

References 

1962 births
Living people
Czech speedway riders
Exeter Falcons riders